Gonbatuk (also Romanized as Gonbatūk; also known as Jozbatūk) is a village in Zibad Rural District, Kakhk District, Gonabad County, Razavi Khorasan Province, Iran. At the 2006 census, its population was 26, in 7 families.

References 

Populated places in Gonabad County